Renard Cox (born March 3, 1978) is a former American football defensive back. He played for the Jacksonville Jaguars in 2001 and for the Hamilton Tiger-Cats from 2004 to 2007.

References

1978 births
Living people
American football defensive backs
Maryland Terrapins football players
Scottish Claymores players
Jacksonville Jaguars players
Barcelona Dragons players
Hamilton Tiger-Cats players
Expatriate players of American football
American expatriate sportspeople in Scotland
American expatriate sportspeople in Spain
Players of Canadian football from Virginia
Players of American football from Virginia
Sportspeople from Richmond, Virginia